Ovalipes is a genus of crabs in the family Ovalipidae, containing 11 extant species:
Ovalipes australiensis Stephenson & Rees, 1968
Ovalipes catharus (White, 1843)
Ovalipes elongatus Stephenson & Rees, 1968
Ovalipes floridanus Hay & Shore, 1918
Ovalipes georgei Stephenson & Rees, 1968
Ovalipes iridescens (Miers, 1886)
Ovalipes molleri (Ward, 1933)
Ovalipes ocellatus (Herbst, 1799)
Ovalipes punctatus (De Haan, 1833)
Ovalipes stephensoni Williams, 1976
Ovalipes trimaculatus (De Haan, 1833)

References

External links

Portunoidea
Taxa named by Mary J. Rathbun